Cody Sorensen (born 6 October 1986) is a Canadian Olympic bobsledder who has competed since 2008. He is a 4-time World Cup medallist, including third place in the four-man event at Park City and Lake Placid in December 2010. As a member of team Spring, Sorensen was ranked 2nd in the World in 4-man bobsleigh in the 2013/2014 season. Cody was named the 2010 Ontario male athlete of the year. In 2022, at 35 years of age, Cody made an unprecedented return to the Olympics after 8 years of retirement and finished 9th in the 2022 Olympic Games in Beijing. Cody currently leads the mergers and acquisitions division at Welch Capital Partners in Ottawa, Canada.

Career
Before being in bobsleigh, Sorensen was a hurdler at the University of Guelph.

In January 2022, Sorensen was named to Canada's 2022 Olympic team.

References

1986 births
Living people
Bobsledders at the 2014 Winter Olympics
Bobsledders at the 2022 Winter Olympics
Canadian male bobsledders
Olympic bobsledders of Canada
Sportspeople from Ottawa